Jonas Björkman and Thomas Johansson were the defending champions, but lost in the semifinals this year.

Simon Aspelin and Julian Knowle won in the final 6–2, 6–4, against Martín García and Sebastián Prieto.

Seeds

Draw

Draw

External links
Doubles draw

Doubles